St. Kitts Scenic Railway is a  long narrow gauge railway line along the coastline of the island of St. Kitts in the eastern Caribbean, with a track gauge of .

History 

The original track was laid from 1912 to 1926, to deliver sugar cane from the plantations to the new centralised sugar mill in Basseterre. The sugar mill was built by a group of investors in 1912, to reduce processing costs and increase profitability by applying the principle of economies of scale, due to a sugar price drop caused by the worldwide introduction of sugar beets. Previously, each plantation had its own sugar mill. The first section of the railway line, from the Factory Pier to the St. Kitts Basseterre Sugar Factory, with a West Line branch running 4 miles (6.4 km) to Palmetto Point at Trinity and a North Line branch running out to Mills's at Bourryeau Estate, was completed on 28 February 1912. It was celebrated with a special train carrying invited dignitaries. The railway was then operated seasonally from February to June for the annual sugar harvest.

The privately owned St. Kitts Scenic Railway commenced running tourist trains on 28 January 2003. The scheme is run in an unusual partnership between the government and a private enterprise. The slogan “Last Railway in the West Indies” demonstrates its objective to preserve a link to the past, when sugar ruled the island's economy. The slogan is, however, somewhat misleading, as there are still functional railways elsewhere in the West Indies, in Martinique, Jamaica, the Dominican Republic and, most notably, Cuba.

Rolling stock

Locomotives
The railway owns and operates three diesel-hydraulic locomotives of the PKP class Lyd2 built by 23 August Works in Romania. The classification may be interpreted as follows:
 L indicates a narrow gauge locomotive
 y indicates 3 axles (0-6-0 or C)
 d indicates diesel fuel
 2 indicates hydraulic transmission.

The locomotives are configured with a single cab, with driving positions for both directions. The overhauled diesel engines are from Henschel.

Carriages 
The 5 double-decked SKSR “Island Series” rail cars were designed by Colorado Railcar, and built in 2002 by Jeff Hamilton of the Hamilton Manufacturing Company in Washington state, USA. Hamilton designed and constructed a new type of double-decker carriage, of which the roof may be lifted hydraulically to provide unobstructed open-air seating at the top deck. These carriages are essentially a miniature full-dome rail car without the vista-dome glass, and with a canvas canopy roof instead. 

The lower air-conditioned and carpeted parlour deck has six–foot (2 m) vaulted windows, is furnished with cushioned rattan chairs at inlaid 4-and-2 top tables, and is decorated with paintings by local artists. This level includes a bar and restroom in each car. The open-air upper deck seating area is reached by a spiral stairway, and the upper deck offers 360-degree viewing. However, the passenger seats face inward, which restricts viewing somewhat.

References

External links 

 
 All Aboard! Scenic Railway Tour Video of St. Kitts / Saint Christopher Island (Saint-Christophe) on YouTube
 St. Kitts Scenic Railway 2012
 St. Kitts Sugar Manufacturing Corporation (SSMC), 2012
 The St. Kitts Railways 2013

Rail transport in Saint Kitts and Nevis
Heritage railways in Saint Kitts and Nevis
Railway lines opened in 1926
Railway companies of Saint Kitts and Nevis
2 ft 6 in gauge railways
Tourist attractions in Saint Kitts and Nevis